Thayumanavan is a 2013 Indian Tamil-language soap opera that aired on Vijay TV from 15 July 2013 through 5 September 2014 on Monday through Friday 7:30PM (IST). The show stars Mathi, Maheshwari Chanakyan, Kalyani, Kamal, Madhumila, Jeniffer and Sujithra. The show is directed by Francis Kathiravan.

The story of a single father (Mathiazhagan) and his five doting daughters (Maheswari, Kalyani, Madhumila, Nancy Jennifer and Sujithra). The story line revolves around the father-daughter relationship. The different lifestyles of the daughters and the way the father grows up along with his daughters to fulfill the gap of the mother.

Plot
Maha's marriage is stopped as the groom runs off on the day of engagement. To manage the situation, Bharathi, who is Mathi's sister's son, marries Maha. Soon after the marriage, Mathiazhagan learns about Bharathi's love with Janani and he expels him from the family. Maha becomes upset and starts going to work. The father then solves the differences with his daughters and gets them a good life.

Cast

Main

Additional cast

Awards and nominations

References

External links
Official website

Star Vijay original programming
2010s Tamil-language television series
2013 Tamil-language television series debuts
Tamil-language television shows
2014 Tamil-language television series endings